Little Mountain is a summit in the U.S. state of Tennessee.  Part of the Cumberland Plateau, Little Mountain is a section of the Cumberland Escarpment separating the Cumberland Plateau from the Sequatchie Valley.

Little Mountain is in Bledsoe County, Tennessee, just west of Pikeville.

References

Landforms of Bledsoe County, Tennessee
Mountains of Tennessee